Jax-Ur is a supervillain appearing in comic books published by DC Comics, usually as an adversary of Superman. Created by writer Otto Binder and artist George Papp, the character first appeared in Adventure Comics #289 (October 1961). He has been described as "the worst troublemaker in the Phantom Zone" and was the first criminal banished there.

Fictional character biography

Pre-Crisis
Jax-Ur was an amoral and criminally deviant scientist on the planet Krypton. He was imprisoned in the Phantom Zone for destroying Wegthor, an inhabited moon of Krypton (population: 500), while experimenting with a nuclear warhead-equipped rocket. His sentence for his act of mass murder was imprisonment for eternity. He called himself "the worst criminal in the Phantom Zone".

Jax-Ur's intention was to launch a nuclear missile to destroy a passing space rock. If this test proved successful, Jax-Ur would then commence the build-up of a massive, privately held nuclear arsenal with which he would overthrow the Kryptonian government, and place the entire planet under his dominion. In the World of Krypton miniseries, his missile collided with a spaceship piloted by Superman's father Jor-El and went off-course to destroy Wegthor. Because of this, space travel was banned on Krypton.

In his first appearance, Jax-Ur escaped from the Phantom Zone and posed as a super-powered version of Jonathan Kent. Superboy eventually sent Jax-Ur back to the Phantom Zone. He then used Supergirl (Kara Zor-El)'s tears (acquired through psychic communication with Fred Danvers) to escape from the Phantom Zone, but was defeated by Mon-El. Most of his later Silver Age appearances show him in his ghostly Phantom Zone form, except during rare escapes. He was often depicted plotting against Superman with fellow Phantom Zone inmates General Zod and Faora Hu-Ul. Although he possessed typical Kryptonian super-powers when on Earth, the out-of-shape Jax-Ur was no match for Superman in combat.

Jax-Ur would later redeem himself somewhat by helping Superman defeat Black Zero, the alien saboteur who ensured Krypton's destruction under the orders of the Pirate Empire. It is shown he has a code of honor, as Kryptonian criminals swear by a master criminal who escaped a prison to help each other. Struck by a red kryptonite bullet that Black Zero had created, Jax-Ur began mutating through a series of serpentine forms, until he became a Medusa-like creature, and turned Black Zero to stone with his gaze before the villain could destroy Metropolis in revenge for Superman foiling his plan to destroy Earth. Jax-Ur then shattered Black Zero's body, avenging Krypton, and willingly returned to the Phantom Zone.

Post-Crisis
Jax-Ur did not appear after the Crisis on Infinite Earths for some time, as until the recent appearance of Supergirl there was a rule that no Kryptonians survived except Superman. On the occasions that a pseudo-Kryptonian villain was required, writers have usually gone for General Zod. At that time however, Jax-Ur's name was referenced in Superman: The Essential Guide to the Man of Steel, suggesting he may have indeed existed but presumably had died either before or during Krypton's destruction since the Phantom Zone was used as storage rather than a prison.

Jax-Ur's first post-Crisis appearance is in Action Comics #846, written by Geoff Johns and Richard Donner. He is one of the criminals unleashed from the Phantom Zone by Zod. In the current continuity, Jax-Ur destroyed Krypton's moon during an attempt at interstellar space travel. When the moon was destroyed, a lunar colony of Kandor was lost as well, drawing the attention of the Coluan villain Brainiac to Kandor.

Jax-Ur reappears in Action Comics #875, as one of General Zod's "sleeper Kryptonians", who have adopted human identities to help further Zod's goals on Earth. He is using the cover of Dr. Phillings, and works for S.T.A.R. Labs as one of the world's top xenobiologists, while secretly conducting his own gruesome studies on Earth's lifeforms, as well as researching Kryptonian DNA to find links to the Flamebird and Nightwing entities. While in his "Dr. Phillings" identity he's tasked by the female Doctor Light to investigate Nightwing's accelerated aging. He manages to build a device tailored to regulate Chris's growth and stimulate his solar-powered healing factor to reverse the body damage brought by his condition, but at the cost of some DNA taken from Flamebird.

Recently, it was revealed that, like Chris Kent and Thara Ak-Var are avatars of Nightwing and Flamebird, respectively, so is Jax-Ur an avatar of their enemy, "Vohc the Breaker". Continuing his age old vendetta against the two demi-gods, Jax-Ur/Vohc uses the sample from Flamebird and his own ingenuity to create an artificial avatar-clone of the Kryptonian chief god, Rao, a terrifying weapon which he then unleashes upon the world. The combined entity is defeated by Flamebird and Nightwing burning Jax-Ur out of Vohc, leaving him for the Justice Society while the Rao clone is destroyed by Nightwing.

The New 52
In DC's 2011 reboot of its continuity, The New 52, Jax-Ur first appears among the Kryptonian criminals seen in the Phantom Zone and he claims to have destroyed a moon. Jax-Ur was fully introduced in the World of Krypton flashback segments, where he is depicted as a young military officer and Lara Lor-Van's partner and fiancé. Lara calls off their engagement when Jax-Ur reveals he supports Colonel Ekar, a commanding officer who deems Krypton's Science Council weak and self-absorbed and plans to overthrow it with a coup d'état. When Lara tries to fight Colonel Ekar and is defeated and caught, Jax-Ur tries to convince her to join their cause in order to save her life, but fails. General Zod intervenes, killing Ekar and smothering the revolution. Jax-Ur is imprisoned with the other surviving insurgents, promising Lara he tried to save her and reaffirming his love for her.

Powers and abilities
Like all Kryptonians, Jax-Ur possesses superhuman abilities derived from the yellow solar radiation of the sun of Earth's solar system. His basic abilities are superhuman strength, superhuman speed and superhuman stamina sufficient to bend steel in his bare hands, overpower a locomotive, leap over a tall building in a single bound and outrun a speeding bullet; he possesses heightened senses of hearing and sight including X-ray vision as well as telescopic and microscopic vision; virtual invulnerability; accelerated healing; longevity; powerful freezing breath; heat vision; and flight. His powers are generally depicted as being on par with General Zod.

Jax-Ur is generally depicted as both a scientist as well as a military warrior. He is exceptionally intelligent in the areas of cloning as well as xenobiology; able to study Kryptonian genetics to determine connections between the respective Nightwing and Flamebird entities as well as how to create synthesized clones of avatars suitable to host the spirit of the red sun god Rao whom the Kryptonians worshiped. As a soldier, Jax-Ur is a competent military leader and hand-to-hand combatant with experience on the field of battle similar to General Zod and other imprisoned Kryptonian military dissidents.

In addition to his inherent Kryptonian abilities while beneath a yellow sun, Jax-Ur also served as a vessel for the alien god Vohc the Breaker. While merged and possessed by Vohc, Jax-Ur possesses increased superhuman strength as well as being vastly more intelligent with wisdom approaching virtual omniscience. Vohc was also immortal with a vastly superior healing factor rendering him effectively indestructible and possessed of divine power sufficient to place him on similar levels of godly power as the Olympians and other pantheons of Earthly deities. However, his powers were beneath Rao as well as Nightwing and Flamebird.

Similar to General Zod and other Phantom Zone escapees, Jax-Ur generally never experiences the full measure of his abilities as he is never allowed to spend any significant portion of time beneath Earth's yellow sun to charge and metabolize his cells with yellow solar radiation before being banished back into the Zone. As such, should he ever be allowed enough time to fully realize his abilities and potential, Jax-Ur's power levels would very likely approach or possibly surpass those of Superman as he is a fully mature Kryptonian male with exceptional natural physical prowess and experience in combat.

Like all Kryptonians, Jax-Ur is vulnerable to Kryptonite and red solar radiation which neutralizes and cancels out the yellow solar radiation flourishing in his cells. His virtual invulnerability offers no protection from mind control or magic, nor can it fully withstand the force of an atomic explosion or the force of opponents with greater strength and durability such as Doomsday. His superhuman strength is inferior to beings such as Doomsday and his superhuman speed is inferior to Speedsters such as the Flash. Jax-Ur's intelligence does give him the advantage of utilizing his strength and speed to optimal performance.

Other versions

"For the Man Who Has Everything"
Jax-Ur is featured as a symbol and martyr for violent Anti-Phantom Zone protestors who assault Kara Zor-El in the Superman story "For the Man Who Has Everything", written by Alan Moore and illustrated by Dave Gibbons. The protesters believe that Jax-Ur was unjustly convicted and consider the Zone to be cruel and unusual punishment, and thus have dedicated themselves to Jax-Ur's release - by any means necessary.

In other media

Television
 Jax-Ur appears in Superman: The Animated Series, voiced by Ron Perlman. This version is a High General and military genius who sought to overthrow Krypton's Science Council years prior to the series, only to be foiled by Jor-El and sentenced to life imprisonment in the Phantom Zone while his co-conspirator, Mala, was sentenced to 30 years. In the two-part episode "Blasts from the Past", Superman frees Mala, believing she had reformed after completing her sentence, but she later frees Jax-Ur after learning of the powers they gain from a yellow sun. Together, they go on a rampage until Superman and his allies send them back to the Phantom Zone. As of the episode "Absolute Power", Jax-Ur and Mala escaped once more via a space rift, were rescued by alien voyagers, took over their planet, and forced the inhabitants to reshape it to better resemble Krypton. Superman joins forces with a rebel movement to lure Jax-Ur and Mala into space, where they are pulled into a black hole.
 A similarly named character named Dax-Ur appears in Smallville, portrayed by Marc McClure. He is a Kryptonian scientist who has lived over 100 years via blue kryptonite and created Brainiac, who goes on to use Dax-Ur to restore his powers before killing him.
 A female incarnation of Jax-Ur appears in Krypton, portrayed by Hannah Waddingham. Formerly known as Sela-Sonn, this version is the leader of the Black Zero terrorist organization and former member of Krypton's Science Guild. Introduced in the season one episode "Savage Night", she forms an alliance with a time-travelling Dru-Zod, among others, to defend Krypton against Brainiac while serving as a mother figure to the clone Nyssa-Vex. In the second season, following Dru's rise to power and Black Zero's disbandment, Jax-Ur becomes co-leader of a resistance movement against him alongside Val-El, but loses her position after executing Dru's mother, Lyta-Zod, for which she is later banished.
 Jax-Ur appears in Young Justice: Phantoms, voiced by Andrew Kishino.

Film
Jax-Ur appears in Man of Steel, portrayed by Mackenzie Gray. This version is the lead scientist of General Zod's battalion, the Sword of Rao.

Miscellaneous
 Jax-Ur appears in the novel "The Last Days of Krypton", by Kevin J. Anderson. This version is a historical figure from Krypton's past who tried to take over the planet and destroyed its moon, Koron, with a "Nova javelin", a nuclear weapon developed from alien technology. After being defeated by the "Seven Armies" coalition, led by Jor-El's ancestor Sor-El, and assassinated by a former underling, Jax-Ur's actions went on to dictate Krypton's policy towards alien or innovative science.
 The Superman: The Animated Series incarnation of Jax-Ur appears in issues #7-8 of Superman Adventures. In his most notable appearance, he and Mala join forces with Argo City criminal General Zod.
 The Superman: The Animated Series incarnation of Jax-Ur appears in the Justice League Unlimited tie-in comic book as a member of General Zod's army who was sent to the Phantom Zone.
 The Superman: The Animated Series incarnation of Jax-Ur appears in the Justice League Beyond 2.0 tie-in comic. While in the Phantom Zone, he manipulates a young boy he named Zod-Ur, who possesses telekinesis and the ability to control most Kryptonian technology, into tricking Superman into facilitating their escape in the hopes of leading their fellow inmates in conquering Earth. However, the pair are defeated by Superman and the Justice League.

See also
 List of Superman enemies

References

Characters created by Otto Binder
Characters created by George Papp
Comics characters introduced in 1961
Kryptonians
DC Comics characters who can move at superhuman speeds
DC Comics characters with accelerated healing
DC Comics characters with superhuman senses
DC Comics characters with superhuman strength
DC Comics extraterrestrial supervillains
DC Comics film characters
DC Comics scientists
Fictional characters with absorption or parasitic abilities
Fictional characters with air or wind abilities
Fictional characters with energy-manipulation abilities
Fictional characters with fire or heat abilities
Fictional characters with ice or cold abilities
Fictional characters with nuclear or radiation abilities
Fictional characters with slowed ageing
Fictional characters with superhuman durability or invulnerability
Fictional characters with X-ray vision
Fictional generals
Fictional mad scientists
Superman characters